In the semantic web, Simple HTML Ontology Extensions are a small set of HTML extensions designed to give web pages semantic meaning by allowing information such as class, subclass and property  relationships.

SHOE was developed around 1996 by Sean Luke, Lee Spector, James Hendler, Jeff Heflin, and David Rager at the University of Maryland, College Park.

See also 
 EMML (Motorola)
 Microformat
 Microdata (HTML)

References 
 Luke, S., Spector, L, and Rager, D.  Ontology-Based Knowledge Discovery on the World-Wide Web.  Workshop on Internet-Based Information Systems at the 13th National Conference on Artificial Intelligence.  1996.
 Luke, S. and Hendler, J.  Web Agents that Work.  IEEE MultiMedia 4:3.  1997.
 Luke, S., Spector, L., Rager, D., and Hendler, J.  Ontology-based Web Agents.  Proceedings of the First International Conference on Autonomous Agents.  1997.
 Heflin, J., Hendler, J., and Luke, S. SHOE: A Knowledge Representation Language for Internet Applications. Technical Report CS-TR-4078 (UMIACS TR-99-71), Dept. of Computer Science, University of Maryland at College Park. 1999.
 Heflin, J. and Hendler, J. Searching the Web with SHOE. In Artificial Intelligence for Web Search. Papers from the AAAI Workshop. WS-00-01. AAAI Press, Menlo Park, CA, 2000. pp. 35–40.
 Heflin, J. Towards the Semantic Web: Knowledge Representation in a Dynamic, Distributed Environment. Ph.D. Thesis, University of Maryland, College Park. 2001.
 Heflin, J. and Hendler, J. A Portrait of the Semantic Web in Action. IEEE Intelligent Systems, 16(2):54-59, 2001.

External links 
 UMD SHOE web page

Semantic HTML
Domain-specific knowledge representation languages